Borshchyovo is a rural locality (a selo) and the administrative center of Borshchyovskoye Rural Settlement, Khokholsky District, Voronezh Oblast, Russia. The population was 217 as of 2010. There are 6 streets.

Geography
Borshchyovo is located 48 km southeast of Khokholsky (the district's administrative centre) by road. Kamenno-Verkhovka is the nearest rural locality.

References 

Rural localities in Khokholsky District
Korotoyaksky Uyezd